Phosphatidylserine decarboxylase proenzyme is an enzyme that in humans is encoded by the PISD gene.

References

Further reading